Jacques Krauss (1900–1957) was a French art director. He had a notable influence on the visual look of French poetic realist films before the Second World War, due to his work with Julien Duvivier.

He was born in Paris, the son of the actor Henry Krauss.

Selected filmography
 Maria Chapdelaine (1934)
 A Rare Bird (1935)
 La Bandera (1935)
 They Were Five (1936)
 Claudine at School (1937)
 The Man of the Hour (1937)
 Pépé le Moko (1937)
 Woman of Malacca (1937)
 Another World (1937)
 A Woman of No Importance (1937)
 The Courier of Lyon (1937)
 The Curtain Rises (1938)
 The End of the Day (1939)
 The Phantom Carriage (1939)
 The Phantom Baron (1943)
 Sylvie and the Ghost (1946)
 Captain Blomet (1947)
 The Fugitive (1947)
 Darling Caroline (1951)
 A Caprice of Darling Caroline (1953)
 Caroline and the Rebels (1955)

References

Bibliography
 Dudley Andrew. Mists of Regret: Culture and Sensibility in Classic French Film. Princeton University Press, 1995.

External links

1900 births
1957 deaths
Film people from Paris
French art directors